is a Japanese professional baseball catcher for the Tokyo Yakult Swallows in Japan's Nippon Professional Baseball.

External links

NPB.com

1984 births
2015 WBSC Premier12 players
Baseball people from Gifu Prefecture
Japanese baseball players
Kokugakuin University alumni
Living people
Nippon Professional Baseball catchers
Tohoku Rakuten Golden Eagles players
Tokyo Yakult Swallows players
Japanese baseball coaches
Nippon Professional Baseball coaches